Gurtins is a small townland between Saltmills and Stonehouse on the Hook Peninsula in County Wexford, Ireland.

References

Townlands of County Wexford